was a town located in Mima District, Tokushima Prefecture, Japan.

As of 2003, the town had an estimated population of 7,444 and a density of 68.37 persons per km2. The total area was 108.88 km2.

On March 1, 2005, Anabuki, along with the towns of Mima (former) and Waki, and the village of Koyadaira (all from Mima District), was merged to create the city of Mima.

External links
 Mima official website (in Japanese)

Dissolved municipalities of Tokushima Prefecture
Mima, Tokushima